Trinity College (Connecticut) has an annual firefighting robot contest, which is contested by high schools and colleges from around the world. The competition is relevant for its antiquity, being established in 1994. It is one of the oldest in the world still maintained. The competition is open to entrants of any age, ability, or experience from anywhere in the world.

In 2007 a new category was introduced, the baby-finding contest. Participants have to find both a flame and the simulated baby, extinguish the flame, and announce when it finds the latter in the expert division. In the concept division, simply finding the baby and notifying the people is sufficient.

References

Student robotics competitions